Cleoeromene is a monotypic moth genus of the family Crambidae described by David E. Gaskin in 1986. It contains only one species, Cleoeromene smithi, described by Herbert Druce in 1896 which is found in south-western Mexico, including Guerrero.

The wingspan is 15–17 mm.

References

Diptychophorini
Monotypic moth genera
Crambidae genera